Robyn's Best is the reissue of Swedish pop singer Robyn's first studio album Robyn Is Here. It was released by BMG on 1 June 2004 in the United States. While the album is titled like a greatest hits compilation, it is actually just a repackaging of the US edition of Robyn's debut album, Robyn Is Here, with a revised running order and three tracks, "Just Another Girlfriend", "Robyn Is Here" and "I Wish", removed.

Reception

K. Ross Hoffman of AllMusic calls the reissue "a shamelessly misleading and essentially worthless release that seems misguided even as a straight-up cash-grab attempt".

Track listing

References

Robyn albums
Sony BMG albums
Reissue albums
2004 albums